2008 in Russian football.

Overview

2008 Russian Super Cup was held on 9 March at the Luzhniki Stadium, Moscow. Zenit St. Petersburg won the trophy for the first time, beating Lokomotiv Moscow 2–1.
2008 Russian Premier League started on 14 March.
The final of Russian Cup was held on 11 May at the Lokomotiv Stadium, Moscow. CSKA Moscow won the trophy for the fourth time, becoming the second most successful club to win the Cup, after Lokomotiv Moscow's 5 titles.
Zenit St. Petersburg became the second Russian club to win the UEFA Cup, defeating Rangers 2–0 in the final on 14 May.
Russia, along with Turkey, won bronze medals at Euro 2008, having been defeated in the semi-finals 0–3 and 2–3 by Spain and Germany, respectively.
Zenit St. Petersburg became the first Russian club to win UEFA Super Cup, defeating Manchester United 2–1 in the match on 29 August.
Russia started their 2010 FIFA World Cup qualifying campaign on 10 September with a home 2–1 win over Wales.
Rubin Kazan won the Russian Premier League on 2 November (27th matchday), defeating Saturn Moscow Oblast away 2–1 to claim their first title.

National team

 Russia score given first

Key
 H = Home match
 A = Away match
 N = Match on neutral ground
 F = Friendly
 EURO = UEFA Euro 2008
 WCQ = 2010 FIFA World Cup qualifying

Leagues

Premier League

First Division

Second Division

Cups

2007–08 Russian Cup

Quarterfinals

Semifinals

Final

2008 Russian Super Cup

Russian Super Cup 2008 was the 6th Russian Super Cup match, which was contested between the 2007 Russian Premier League champion, Zenit St. Petersburg, and the winner of 2006–07 Russian Cup, Lokomotiv Moscow.

References
RFPL
RFS

 
Seasons in Russian football